Televizija Vijesti  is a national broadcaster in Montenegro. It is based in Podgorica.

Televizija Vijesti (TV Vijesti) aims to become the leader in informative programming in Montenegro. TV Vijesti employs around one hundred workers, including expert journalists and technical experts using the network's latest technology.

Programs
Informative programs

 Vijesti
 Bez granica
 Meteo centar
 Načisto sa Petrom Komnenićem
 Boje jutra
 Extra lifestyle

References

External links

Television stations in Montenegro
Television channels and stations established in 2008
Mass media in Podgorica